Ernie Adams may refer to:
Ernie Adams (actor) (1885–1947), American film actor
Ernie Adams (American football) (born 1953), American football coach and administrator
Ernie Adams (footballer, born 1922), English association footballer
Ernie Adams (footballer, born 1948), English association footballer
Ernie Adams (Australian footballer) (1878–1946), Australian rules footballer

See also
Ernest Adams (disambiguation)